The Katherine Reese Pamplin College of Arts, Humanities, and Social Sciences is one of ten colleges and schools at Augusta University, and is the largest with seven departments. It offers a variety of undergraduate degrees, an MA in Intelligence and Security Studies and also an NASPAA-certified Master of Public Administration. Classes are primarily located in Allgood Hall on the Summerville campus, with music classes primarily in the music building and art classes in Washington Hall.

Accreditations include the Council on Social Work Education, National Association of Schools of Art and Design, National Association of Schools of Public Affairs and Administration, and the National Association of Schools of Music.

History

When it first formed, Augusta College offered degrees in science and another in the arts, providing the foundation for what eventually became the College of Arts and Sciences within the university.

The college is now named after Robert B. Pamplin, Sr.'s wife Katherine, who graduated from Augusta College. Originally, it was called the Katherine Reese Pamplin College of Arts and Sciences, but split in the summer of 2012 into two parts so the Deans could have a narrower focus. The College of Science and Mathematics sprung from the division, with the Pamplin College of Arts, Humanities, and Social Sciences stemming from everything else.

Departments
Pamplin has seven departments:
Art and Design
Communication
English & World Languages
History, Anthropology, and Philosophy
Music
Psychological Sciences
Social Sciences

Degrees
Each department offers a range of degrees, primarily at the undergraduate level:

Art
B.F.A., General Art
B.F.A., Drawing/Painting
B.F.A., Sculpture/Ceramics
B.F.A., Printmaking/Photography
B.F.A., Graphic Design
B.F.A., Animation
B.A., General Art
B.A., Pre-Medical Illustration

Communication
Each degree is a Bachelor of Arts in Communication, from one of five tracks:
Communication Studies
Theatre
Journalism
Public Relations
Television and Cinema

English and Foreign Languages
B.A., English, English Literature
B.A., English, English/Secondary Education
B.A., English, Creative Writing
B.A., English, Professional Writing and Rhetoric 
B.A., Foreign Languages, French
B.A., Foreign Languages, French Education
B.A., Foreign Languages, Spanish
B.A., Foreign Languages, Spanish Education

History, Anthropology, and Philosophy
B.A., Anthropology 
B.A., History
B.A., History with Secondary Teacher Certification

Music
B.A., Music 
B.M., Music Education
B.M., Instrumental Performance
B.M., Piano Performance
B.M., Vocal Performance

Political Science
B.A., Political Science
Concentrations include International Studies, Security Studies, Legal Studies, Public Administration, and Secondary School Teaching
M.P.A., with optional track for Criminal Justice

Sociology
B.S., Sociology
B.S., Criminal Justice
B.S., Social Work

References

Augusta University